Lauri Conger is notable primarily as the keyboardist and one of the principal co-writers of most of the songs of The Parachute Club.

History 

Lauri Conger is a native of Thunder Bay, where she began her professional music career in the 1970s.  She received early piano and dance training in Port Arthur, Ontario, prior to its merger into Thunder Bay, and was a graduate of Hillcrest High School.

Conger moved to Toronto, where she and Lorraine Segato were members of Mama Quilla II. In 1982, Conger and Segato, along with percussionist Billy Bryans, formed the nucleus of what would become The Parachute Club. Concurrently, in the early 1980s, Conger was developing a reputation as a solo and duo performer on the Canadian folk music circuit.

Conger and Lorraine Segato, together with other band members and lyricist Lynne Fernie, wrote of most of the group's songs, including the song for which the group is best known, "Rise Up".

Conger was a band member during the production of its three albums, released between 1983 and 1986, but left the group in mid-1987. Her final performance was before the Duke and Duchess of York in Toronto. She then trained in Santa Fe, New Mexico to become a registered massage therapist. She rejoined the band in July, 1988, for what would be its final performances at Toronto's Ontario Place.

Following her departure from the group and despite her significant contributions to music, Conger did not continue in a prominent role as a professional musician or songwriter.

Discography

Singles (Parachute Club)

Albums

With Mama Quilla II

1982 KKK//Mama Quilla/Angry Young Woman Tupperwaros; EP.

With The Parachute Club
1983 The Parachute Club Current/RCA
1984 At The Feet of the Moon Current/RCA
1985 Moving Thru the Moonlight Current/RCA; remixes
1986 Small Victories (1986) Current/RCA
1992 Wild Zone: The Essential Parachute Club BMG; reissued 2006 by EMI International

With Other Artists

1980 Heather Bishop, Celebration
1980 Rodney Brown, When The Bay Turns Blue
1981 Mendelson Joe, Let's Party
1982 Heather Bishop, Bellybutton (Children's Album)
1982 Heather Bishop, I Love Women Who Laugh
1985 Soundtrack (with Michael Beinhorn), Dark Lullabies (Director: Irene Angelico and Abbey Neidik) (National Film Board of Canada)
1986 Lillian Allen, Revolutionary Tea Party
1988 Lillian Allen, Conditions Critical
1988 Soundtrack, Calling The Shots, being profile of Jeanne Moreau (Director: Janis Cole and Holly Dale)
1988 Soundtrack, Mile Zero: The SAGE Tour (Director: Bonnie Sherr Klein) (National Film Board of Canada)

References 

Canadian singer-songwriters
Canadian rock musicians
Canadian rock keyboardists
Living people
Musicians from Thunder Bay
Musicians from Toronto
The Parachute Club members
Year of birth missing (living people)